Kenghkam or Keng Hkam (also known as Kyaingkan) was a Shan state in what is today Burma. The capital was the town of Keng Hkam, located by the Nam Pang River.

History
Kenghkam was initially a tributary of the Konbaung dynasty. It was founded in 1811 and was located north of the sub-state of Kengtawng. The state was occupied by Mongnai State from 1870 to 1874 and again from 1878 to 1882, when it was annexed directly.

Rulers
The rulers of the state bore the title Myoza.
1811 - 1854                Bodaw Sao Hkam Yi
1855 - 1864                Sao Hkun Mwe
1864 - 1870                Naw Hkam Leng
1870 - 1870                incorporated into Möngnai
1874 - 1878                Sao Hkun Long
1878 - 1882                incorporated into Möngnai
1882 - c.1889              Sao Naw Süng
c.1889 - 1905              Hkun Un                            (b. 18.. - d. 1905)
1905 - 19..                Hkun Nawng Hkam                    (b. 1891 - d. 19..)
1905 - 1914?               Sao Nang Tid Hti La (f) -Regent

See also
Tip Htila

References

Shan States